The Brink is a 2017 Hong Kong action crime-thriller film directed by Jonathan Li and written by Lee Chun-fai. The film stars Zhang Jin, Shawn Yue, Janice Man and Wu Yue, with Gordon Lam making a special appearance. It was released in theaters on 23 November 2017.

Premise
Sai Gau is a reckless police officer who is dead set on tracking down Shing, a smuggler of black market gold. When he learns that Shing is going after a triad boss's underwater gold vault, Sai Gau takes to the high seas to hunt for his prey.

Cast
 Zhang Jin as Sai Gau
 Shawn Yue as Shing
 Janice Man as  Suet
 Wu Yue as Tak
 Tai Po as Shui Sing
 Cecilia So as Adopted daughter of Sai Gau
 Yasuaki Kurata as Blackie

Special appearance
 Gordon Lam as Chan

Guest appearance
 Derek Tsang as Shui Sing's son

Soundtrack

Awards and nominations

References

External links

2017 films
2010s Cantonese-language films
Hong Kong action thriller films
2017 action thriller films
Police detective films
2017 directorial debut films
2010s Hong Kong films